In mathematics, and especially topology, a Pytkeev space is a topological space that satisfies qualities more subtle than a convergence of a sequence. They are named after E. G. Pytkeev, who proved in 1983 that sequential spaces have this property.

Definitions 

Let X be a topological space.

Examples

 Every sequential space is also a Pytkeev space. This is because, if  then there exists a sequence {ak} that converges to x. So take the countable π-net of infinite subsets of A to be }.
 If X is a Pytkeev space, then it is also a Weakly Fréchet–Urysohn space.

References

Further reading 

Topology